Polymyces is a genus of corals belonging to the family Flabellidae.

The species of this genus are found in Pacific Ocean and western Atlantic Ocean.

Species:

Polymyces fragilis 
Polymyces montereyensis 
Polymyces wellsi

References

Flabellidae
Scleractinia genera